The Hy-VeeDeals.com 250 presented by DoorDash and Hy-Vee Salute to Farmers 300 presented by Google are IndyCar Series races held at the Iowa Speedway in Newton, Iowa. The first event was held in 2007. From 2007 to 2013, it was a 250-lap (218.75 miles) race; beginning in 2014, the race was increased to 300 laps (262.5 miles).  For 2020, the race reverted to 250 laps, with consecutive 250-lap races on Friday and Saturday night. After being left off of the calendar for 2021, it will returned to the 2022 schedule with the 250/300 format held in years previous.

Indy car history in Iowa
The first Championship Car race in Iowa took place on July 9, 1915. AAA held a  race at Tri-State Fair Grounds in Burlington, Iowa, won by Bob Burman. Additional AAA races were held at Des Moines Speedway in Valley Junction, a one-mile (1.6 km) wooden board track, in 1915 and 1916. Only two championship car races, won by Ralph Mulford and Ralph DePalma respectively, were held at Des Moines, as the track closed and was dismantled shortly thereafter.

On August 6, 2006, IndyCar & Iowa Speedway officials announced the first IndyCar race at Iowa Speedway would be held June 24, 2007. The race itself was a crashfest with the 10th-place finisher of Scott Dixon finishing 77 laps down to the winning driver of Dario Franchitti.

In October 2013, Iowa Speedway announced that the 2014 race was extended to 300 laps.

In most years since its inception, the race has been held as a Sunday afternoon event. In 2011, 2012, 2014, 2015 and 2019, it was held as a Saturday night race under the lights.

In 2020 IndyCar had two 250-lap races at the track using a double header format with both races taking place at night on July 17 and 18.
On September 30, 2020, IndyCar revealed their 2021 schedule and announced that due to financial issues with the Iowa Speedway their date had been dropped from the schedule along with Richmond Raceway, the latter not hosting a race in 2020 due to COVID-19 restrictions in the state of Virginia.

Iowa was left off the calendar for 2021, to the disappointment of fans and drivers alike. Former series champion and team owner Bobby Rahal managed to secure new sponsorship for the event from Iowa supermarket chain Hy-Vee and was successful in returning IndyCar racing to the speedway on a multi year agreement starting in 2022. A double header race weekend will be used as the format for the event going forward, with one 250 lap race and one 300 lap race.

Past winners

IndyCar Series

2019: Race finished after midnight on Sunday after being postponed same day due to lightning policy.

Current support series winners

Indy Lights Series

Previous support series winners

ARCA

Starting in 2015 until 2020, the race was held as a support race for the IndyCar weekend.

2015: Race extended due to NASCAR overtime.

U.S. F2000 National Championship

Pro Mazda

USAC National Midget Championship

USAC Silver Crown Series

References

External links 

http://www.iowaspeedway.com/
IndyCar.com race page

 
Recurring sporting events established in 2007
IndyCar Series races